Braddon Clive Green (born 18 January 1959 in Benalla, Victoria) is a former cricketer who captained the Australian under-19 ODI team on two occasions and played first-class cricket for Devon County Cricket Club and the Victorian cricket team.

See also
 List of Victoria first-class cricketers

External links
Cricinfo: Braddon Green

Australian cricketers
Victoria cricketers
Devon cricketers
Living people
1959 births
People from Benalla
Cricketers from Victoria (Australia)